Clinotaenia grata is a species of tephritid or fruit flies in the genus Clinotaenia of the family Tephritidae.

References

Dacinae